Vignali may refer to:

People
 Andrea Vignali, Italian footballer
 Carlos Vignali, American drug trafficker
 Jacopo Vignali (1592–1664), Italian painter
 Julia Vignali (born 1975), French actress and television presenter
 Luca Vignali (born 1996), Italian football midfielder
 Luigi Vignali, an Italian writer, television and theater author of the duo Gino & Michele
 Mario  Vignali, Disney studios, art

Animals
 Chrysallida vignali, species of sea snail
 Gibberula vignali, species of very small sea snail
 Joculator vignali, species of minute sea snail, a marine gastropod mollusc in the family Cerithiopsidae

Italian-language surnames